District 8 Athletic Association administers secondary school sports servicing the Catholic and Independent high schools of the Kitchener, Waterloo and Cambridge region. It is a member of Central Western Ontario Secondary Schools Association and Ontario Federation of School Athletic Associations.

Member Schools

District 8 comprises eight member schools.  

École secondaire Père-René-de-Galinée
Monsignor Doyle Catholic Secondary School
Resurrection Catholic Secondary School
Rockway Mennonite Collegiate
St. Benedict Catholic Secondary School (Cambridge)
St. David Catholic Secondary School
St. Mary's High School (Kitchener)
Woodland Christian High School

Sports 
Badminton
Basketball
Cross Country
Field Hockey
Golf
Swimming
Tennis
Track and Field
Volleyball

WCSSAA
District 8 schools have playing privileges as a guests in the Waterloo County Secondary School Athletics Association (WCSSAA).  Leagues which District 8 are a part of are:

Alpine Skiing
Curling
Ice hockey
Wrestling

Ath
Christian sports organizations